Dick Tracy (also known as Dick Tracy, Detective) is a 1945 American action film based on the Dick Tracy comic strip created by Chester Gould. The film is the first of four installment of the Dick Tracy film series, released by RKO Radio Pictures.

Plot
Dick Tracy, a supremely intelligent police detective, must solve a series of brutal murders in which the victims, all from different social and economic backgrounds, are viciously slashed to pieces by the one known as Splitface. Suspects abound but Tracy must find the common link of extortion and revenge before more are killed.

Tracy narrowly misses Splitface at the scene of his second murder, but does encounter a rooftop astronomer, Linwood J.Starling, and it seems unlikely that Splitface went unseen by him. Arrested on suspicion, his "mystic" attitude confounds police interrogators.

A knife left behind at a murder scene is traced to the home/business of mortician Deathridge. The layout of his business suggests it would be easy to steal from his supply room. Tracy leaves to pursue leads at The Paradise Club nightclub, taking Tess along as "cover". But when Deathridge doesn't answer his phone all evening, Tracy returns there and finds him murdered.

The city's mayor has been receiving death threats, even though he is "well above" the other victims in status. The mayor finally remembers, at Tracy's prodding, that he served as a juror before he went into politics. A hulking man named Alexis Banning was found guilty of knifing his sweetheart to death. Tracy puts out an ABP on Banning.

Professor Starling has been released on a writ. It develops that he is Splitface's silent partner, but had written extortion notes on his own; hoping to make money on the side. Splitface considers this a breach of trust and brutally murders Starling, tossing him through a skylight.

Splitface boldly goes to Tracy's rooming house and kidnaps Tess Trueheart as "leverage". Junior Tracy tails the getaway car and leaves a trail for the police. Tracy conquers Splitface in a brutal fistfight and life at the precinct returns to normal (with Tess once again stood up for a dinner date by a homicide).

Cast
 Morgan Conway as Dick Tracy, the tough detective, who lets nothing stand in the way of justice.
 Anne Jeffreys as Tess Trueheart, Tracy's girlfriend, who often falls victim to her boyfriend's workaholism.
 Mike Mazurki as Alexis "Splitface" Banning, a psychotic ex-con who seeks revenge. His weapon is a sharp surgical knife. He has a big disfiguring scar across his face.
 Jane Greer as Jane Owens, a suspect.
 Lyle Latell as Pat Patton, Tracy's bumbling assistant.
 Joseph Crehan as Chief Brandon, the reliable chief of police.
 Mickey Kuhn as Junior, Tracy's adopted son.
 Trevor Bardette as Prof. Linwood J. Starling, a strange medium, and also a suspect.
 Morgan Wallace as Steve Owens, a stern businessman.
 Milton Parsons as Deathridge the Undertaker, a mysterious, skeletal suspect.
 William Halligan as Mayor, the worried mayor of Chicago.
 Jason Robards Sr. as Motorist (uncredited)

Production 
Getting the rights to produce Dick Tracy from the character's creator, Chester Gould, cost RKO pictures $10,000. This was the first in a series of Dick Tracy films produced by RKO.

References

Bibliography

External links

 
 
 
 
 
Review of film at Variety

1945 films
1945 crime films
American black-and-white films
Dick Tracy films
1940s English-language films
Film noir
Films scored by Roy Webb
Films about organized crime in the United States
Films based on American comics
Films directed by William A. Berke
RKO Pictures films
1940s police procedural films
American crime films
1940s American films